Villa del Rosario is a city in the center of the province of Córdoba, Argentina. It is located 80 km east-southeast from the provincial capital Córdoba, on the right-hand (southern) banks of the Segundo River (also known as Xanaes).
On December 2, 2013, much of the city was destroyed in a powerful tornado.

References
 
 Portal de Villa del Rosario — City portal.

Populated places in Córdoba Province, Argentina